Doriones Saddle (‘Sedlovina Doriones’ \se-dlo-vi-'na do-ri-'o-nes\) is the ice-covered saddle of elevation  on Brabant Island in the Palmer Archipelago, Antarctica, connecting Avroleva Heights on the east to Taran Plateau in Stribog Mountains on the west.  It is part of the glacial divide between Laënnec Glacier to the north and Svetovrachene Glacier to the south.

The saddle is named after the ancient Roman station of Doriones in Western Bulgaria.

Location
British mapping in 1980 and 2008.

Maps
 Antarctic Digital Database (ADD). Scale 1:250000 topographic map of Antarctica. Scientific Committee on Antarctic Research (SCAR). Since 1993, regularly upgraded and updated.
British Antarctic Territory. Scale 1:200000 topographic map. DOS 610 Series, Sheet W 64 62. Directorate of Overseas Surveys, Tolworth, UK, 1980.
Brabant Island to Argentine Islands. Scale 1:250000 topographic map. British Antarctic Survey, 2008.

Notes

References
 Bulgarian Antarctic Gazetteer. Antarctic Place-names Commission. (details in Bulgarian, basic data in English)
 Doriones Saddle. SCAR Composite Antarctic Gazetteer.

External links
 Doriones Saddle on AADC website
 Doriones Saddle on SCAR website
 Doriones Saddle. Copernix satellite image

Landforms of the Palmer Archipelago
Bulgaria and the Antarctic